Scott Oelslager (born October 15, 1953) is a Republican politician from Ohio who currently represents the 48th District in the Ohio House of Representatives. He previously held the same seat from 2003 to 2010 and also served in the Ohio Senate from 1985 to 2002 and again from 2011 to 2018.

Life and career
A graduate of Mount Union College, Oelslager formerly worked as an aide for his predecessor, Tom Walsh. When Walsh resigned his seat, Oelslager was first appointed to replace him in 1985, and was re-elected in 1986 with 52% of the vote. Following that election, Oelslager was elected three more times.

In 2002, Oeslager faced term-limits and instead he was elected to the Ohio House of Representatives for the 51st district, and was re-elected in 2004, 2006 and 2008. Oelslager was unopposed in 2004 and 2008.  He again was term-limited out of the House in 2010.

Return to the Ohio Senate
In 2010, Oelslager decided to run for his old seat in the Ohio Senate, swapping seats with Kirk Schuring, who preceded Oelslager in the House. Oelslager defeated his opponent, Richard Reinbold, with 59% of the vote.  In his return to the Senate, Oelslager served as chairman of the Health & Human Services Committee for the 129th Ohio General Assembly.

For the 130th Ohio General Assembly, Oelslager was named chairman of the Senate Finance Committee, the committee tasked with amending the Governor's budget. He was re-elected easily in 2014, attaining 66% of the vote over Democrat Connie Rubin.

Term limited again in 2018, Oelslager again switched seats with Schuring, again winning a seat in the Ohio House of Representatives.  He was sworn in for his fifth term in the house on January 3, 2019.

Electoral history

References

External links
State Senator Scott Oelslager | Facebook
Scott Oelslager - RSCC | Ohio Senate GOP | Official Site

1953 births
21st-century American politicians
Capital University Law School alumni
Living people
People from North Canton, Ohio
People from Warren, Pennsylvania
Republican Party members of the Ohio House of Representatives
Republican Party Ohio state senators
University of Mount Union alumni